Altenklingen Castle is a castle in late Renaissance style in the Swiss Canton of Thurgau in the municipality of Wigoltingen.

It is a Swiss heritage site of national significance. Since 1595 the castle and the surrounding area is privately owned by the Zollicoffer  family.

See also
 List of castles in Switzerland

References

Cultural property of national significance in Thurgau
Castles in Thurgau